ECMAScript (ES) is a JavaScript standard intended to ensure the interoperability of web pages across different browsers. It is standardized by Ecma International in the document ECMA-262.

ECMAScript is commonly used for client-side scripting on the World Wide Web, and it is increasingly being used for writing server-side applications and services using Node.js and other runtime environments.

ECMAScript, ECMA-262 and JavaScript 

ECMA-262, or the ECMAScript Language Specification, defines the ECMAScript Language, or just ECMAScript.

History
The ECMAScript specification is a standardized specification of a scripting language developed by Brendan Eich of Netscape; initially named Mocha, then LiveScript, and finally JavaScript. In December 1995, Sun Microsystems and Netscape announced JavaScript in a press release. In November 1996, Netscape announced a meeting of the Ecma International standards organization to advance the standardization of JavaScript. The first edition of ECMA-262 was adopted by the Ecma General Assembly in June 1997. Several editions of the language standard have been published since then. The name "ECMAScript" was a compromise between the organizations involved in standardizing the language, especially Netscape and Microsoft, whose disputes dominated the early standards sessions. Eich commented that "ECMAScript was always an unwanted trade name that sounds like a skin disease." ECMAScript has been formalized through operational semantics by work at Stanford University and the Department of Computing, Imperial College London for security analysis and standardization.
"ECMA" stood for "European Computer Manufacturers Association" until 1994.

Version history

Features 

The ECMAScript language includes structured, dynamic, functional, and prototype-based features.

Imperative and structured 
ECMAScript JavaScript supports C style structured programming. Previously, JavaScript only supported function scoping using the keyword var, but ECMAScript 2015 added the keywords let and const allowing JavaScript to support both block scoping and function scoping. JavaScript supports automatic semicolon insertion, meaning that semicolons that are normally used to terminate a statement in C may be omitted in JavaScript.

Functions are weakly typed and may accept and return any type.

Weakly typed 
ECMAScript is weakly typed. This means that certain types are assigned implicitly based on the operation being performed. However, there are several quirks in JavaScript's implementation of the conversion of a variable from one type to another. These quirks have been the subject of a  talk entitled Wat.

Dynamic 
ECMAScript is dynamically typed. Thus, a type is associated with a value rather than an expression. ECMAScript supports various ways to test the type of objects, including duck typing.

Transpiling 

Since ES 2015, transpiling JavaScript has become very common. Transpilation is a source-to-source compilation in which newer versions of JavaScript are used, and a transpiler rewrites the source code so that it is supported by older browsers. Usually, transpilers transpile down to ES3 to maintain compatibility with all versions of browsers. The settings to transpiling to a specific version can be configured according to need. Transpiling adds an extra step to the build process and is sometimes done to avoid needing polyfills. Polyfills create new features for older environments that lack them. Polyfills do this at runtime in the interpreter, such as the user's browser or on the server. Instead, transpiling rewrites the ECMA code itself during the build phase of development before it reaches the interpreter.

Conformance 
In 2010, Ecma International started developing a standards test for Ecma 262 ECMAScript.
Test262 is an ECMAScript conformance test suite that can be used to check how closely a JavaScript implementation follows the ECMAScript Specification. The test suite contains thousands of individual tests, each of which tests some specific requirement(s) of the ECMAScript specification. The development of Test262 is a project of the Ecma Technical Committee 39 (TC39). The testing framework and individual tests are created by member organizations of TC39 and contributed to Ecma for use in Test262.

Important contributions were made by Google (Sputnik testsuite) and Microsoft who both contributed thousands of tests.
The Test262 testsuite consisted of  tests . ECMAScript specifications through ES7 are well-supported in major web browsers. The table below shows the conformance rate for current versions of software with respect to the most recent editions of ECMAScript.

See also 
 ECMAScript for XML (E4X)
 JavaScript
 JScript
 List of ECMAScript engines

References 

Computer-related introductions in 1997
C programming language family
Computer standards
Dynamically typed programming languages
Ecma standards
JavaScript dialect engines
JavaScript programming language family
Object-based programming languages
Programming languages with an ISO standard
Prototype-based programming languages
Scripting languages
Source-to-source compilers